Orlogsværftet was a Danish naval shipyard under the Royal Danish Navy. Before 1924, it was an integral part of the naval base at Holmen in central Copenhagen, Denmark, with an independent management from 1692 when Olaus Judichær became the first factory director.

In 1924, the shipyard was established as a regular company under the Naval Ministry, responsible for building and maintaining naval ships and aircraft.

Orlogsværftet delivered its last newly built vessel in 1970, the submarine Nordkaperen, and continued as a repair yard until 1995, when the navy was moved out of Copenhagen to Korsør and Frederikshavn. Maersk-owned Odense Steel Shipyard replaced Orlogsværftet as the navy's primary shipyard.

In the 20th century the ship yard also produced a smaller number of civilian vessels, including ferrys for the Danish State Railways, boats for the Royal Danish Mail and a single ship for GN Store Nord.

Personnel

The chief designer at Orlogsværftet was given the title of Fabriksmester.

List of ships launched from Orlogsværftet
 Frigate Bellona on 15 September 1830
 Ship of the Line Christian den Ottende on 22 May 1840
 Ship of the Line Dannebrog on 25 September 1850
 Frigate  on 20 November 1860
 Corvette  on 1 November 1861
 Armored Schooner  on 11 November 1863
 Ironclad  on 6 August 1868
 Ironclad  on 12 December 1872
 Ironclad  on 9 May 1878
 Steam Ship Dannebrog on 6 October 1879
 Corvette  on 27 September 1882
 Ironclad  on 14 April 1886
 Cruiser  on 8 September 1888
 Cruiser  on 28 November 1890
 Cruiser  on 5 July 1892
 Cruiser  on 30 August 1894
 Ironclad  on 2 September 1899
 Ironclad  on 9 May 1903
 Ironclad  on 2 May 1908
 Submarine  on 21 August 1912, followed by another five A-class submarines until 2 October 1914
 Submarine  on 12 August 1914 followed by another four B-Class submarines until 15 April 1916
 Torpedo Boat  followed by another nine Springeren-Class Torpedo Boats on 8 July 1916
 Coastal defence ship  on 3 July 1918
 Submarine  on 19 March followed by another two C-Class submarines until 2 April 1920
 Submarine  on 9 December followed by the other D-Class submarine  on 3 June 1926
 Torpedo Boat  followed by another two Dragen-Class Torpedo Boats on 8 November 1929
 Royal Yacht  on 10 October 1931
 Torpedo Boat  followed by another two Glenten-Class torpedo boats on 6 January 1933
 Mine sweeper  followed by another five Søløven-Class Mine Sweepers on 3 December 1938
 Cutter  followed by another six cutters on 13 June 1941
 Torpedo Boat  on 21 September 1946 followed by another five Krieger-Class Torpedo Boats
 Torpedo Boat  followed by another five Flyvefisken-Class torpedo boats on 11 May 1954 in cooperation with Frederikssund Shipyard 
 Home Guard Cutter Saturn followed by another two cutters on 11 November 1957
 Torpedo Boat  followed by another three Falken-Class torpedo boats on 19 December 1961
 Torpedo Boat  followed by another three Søløven-Class Torpedo Boat on 19 August 1964. 
 Submarine  followed by another Narhvalen-class submarine on 10 September 1968

Aircraft produced at Orlogsværftet
From 1913 to 1943, a series of aircraft were produced at Orlogsværftet, known under the name Orlogsværftet Flyvemaskineværksted (Orlogsværftet Flying Machine Workshop). After the navy purchased two Donnet-Leveque Flying Boats in 1913, the machines were improved in the workshops at Orlogsværftet, following poor performance in the initial flights. Following this effort the workshops produced a series of 8 flying boats powered by the imported 80 HP Gnome engines, serving until 1919. Another 25 flying boats were produced following improvements of the same design for military and civilian use.
In 1917, the workshops copied a German Friedrichshafen 29 Floatplane which had stranded in Denmark. As the floatplanes outperformed the flying boats, a shift was made towards this line of aircraft, and another four copies were made with 160 HP Curtiss or 150 HP Benz engines. Following a few years of service, a in house copy of the engine was manufactured under the name O.V. 160.

See also
 Danish Shipbuilders

References

External links
 Information

1692 establishments in Denmark
1995 disestablishments in Denmark
History of Copenhagen
Former buildings and structures in Copenhagen
Royal Danish Navy